The Spinola Book of Hours is a sixteenth-century illuminated manuscript, consisting of 310 folios with 84 fully illustrated miniature paintings. This medieval manuscript was produced in the region between Bruges and Ghent in Flanders around 1510-1520. According to Thomas Kren, a former curator of the J. Paul Getty Museum,  the artwork within the Spinola Hours can be attributed to five distinct artists. Forty-seven of these illuminated pages can be accredited to the 'Master of James IV'. The Spinola Hours bears a central coat-of-arms on the cover indicating it belonged to the Spinola family of Genoa. Today it is located at the J. Paul Getty Museum in Los Angeles.

Provenance 
According to the J. Paul Getty Musem, the Spinola Hours was most likely commissioned for a member of the Spinola family; however, the identity of the specific patron is still unknown. Numerous sources have stated the Spinola Hours could have been commissioned for Margaret of Austria on account of it similar binding to the Tres Riches Heures, which many scholars believe to have once belonged to her. In addition, Gerard Hourenbout, a court artist who illuminated the Sforza Hours and served under Margaret of Austria, was associated with the Master of James IV. 

Eventually, the manuscript made its way into the hands of H.P Kraus, who acquired the Spinola Hours from a private collection by auction in Sothebys on July 5, 1976 for £370,000. In 1983, Dr. Peter Ludwig (1925-1996) and his wife Irene Ludwig (1927-2010) of Aachan and Cologne, chocolate billionaires and art collectors, purchased the Spinola Hours from H.P Kraus. Later that same year, the entire Ludwig collection was sold en bloc to the new J. Paul Getty Museum.

Attributions 
There were five distinct artists of the Spinola Hours, as described by Thomas Kren and his colleagues. The first is the Master of James IV, a painter named from his participation in the Hours of James IV of Scotland located in Vienna. He alone is credited for forty-seven of the illuminated pages. The other four artists are likely to have worked under him. 'Master of the First Prayerbook of Maximilian' is credited with twenty-four miniatures, eight were credited to the 'Master of the Lübeck Bible', three to the 'Master of the Dresden Prayerbook', and two to the 'Master of the Prayer Books of around 1500'. No signs of collaboration on individual illuminations were identified in this manuscript.

Description

Materials and appearance 
The Spinola Hours is larger than many other Books of Hours, consisting of ink on parchment with tempera colors and gold leaf. The manuscript is bound in eighteenth-century dark red leather with a gold floral border on both front and back covers. In the center of each cover is the coat-of-arms of the Spinola family of Genoa. (Both the Spinola Hours and the Tres Riches Heures share a nearly identical central coat-of-arms, but there is no connection between the two). The first three-quarters of the Spinola Hours reflect visible artistic consistency; however, anomalies in the gatherings and inconsistencies in border size start to appear closer towards the end of the book. Notably, the type of script used throughout the Spinola Hours is Gothic. Both red and gold coloring would be used to emphasize a particular text.

Illuminations

Style 
Each of the five artists can be identified by specific folios and style choices. The first 14 illuminated miniatures, or 'The Weekday Hours' were painted by the Master of James IV. Many of the borders and decor surrounding the miniatures can be accredited to him as well, these borders acted as the base example for the other four to work off of.

Master of the First Prayerbook of Maximilian made the second largest contribution to the miniatures in the book, creating twenty-four. Thomas Kren sorts his figures into two categories, the first set of figures are identified as primarily female saints. There were more distinct pink-tones in the skin, large broad heads, and exhibit no gray undertones often found in his illuminations. The second set is made up of primarily male saints and includes Evangelist portraits, The Last Judgement (fol. 165v), Saint John the Baptist Preaching (fol. 276v), as well as the illustrations to various accessory texts. 

Master of Dresden painted openings for lauds and prime (fols. 119v-120) of the Hours of the Virgin. The Mocking of Christ in the border surrounding Christ before Caiaphas is also attributed to him.

Master of the Lübeck Bible is most known for his distinctive figures, as they were smaller in comparison to other figures done by the other artists. The faces, while still expressive, are less detailed and shown to be in a loose technique.

Master of the Prayer Books of around 1500, his pair of miniatures (fols. 125-126) is known for its landscapes, notably echoing the style of 'The Adoration of the Shepherds'''.

Some of the borders framing the text heavy folios imitate carved wood or textiles. The borders were often decorated with organic forms that included a variety of flowers, berries, insects, and other earthly elements. This particular style is loosely known as the 'Ghent-Bruges' style.

 The Annunciation 

The Hours of the Virgin Mary is the most principle text in the Spinola Hours; unlike many other Book of Hours where the leading text is presented during the beginning, it does not begin until a third of the way into the book. The Annunciation (fol. 92v) illustrated by the Master of James IV, showcases a framed panel in a special red text "incipiu[n]t hore beate marie virginis secundu[m] usu[m] Romanu[m]. Ad matutin[as]", 'The Hours of the Blessed Virgin Mary are beginning according to the usage of Rome - At Matins'.
 Holy Trinity Enthroned The Holy Trinity Enthroned (fol.10v) is one of the earliest fully painted illustrations featured in the Spinola Hours by the Master of James IV. Each of the three figures is distinguishable from the waist up but share only one robe, this symbolism is apart of the early Christian belief is that Trinity is made up of three persons and one substance. Red encased text identifies the following text as the prayer of Matins of the Hours of the Holy Trinity, naturally to be read on Sunday. The black text begins with a line from Psalm 50: "Domine labia mea aperies", 'Lord, open my lips'.

Gallery

 Bibliography 
 Scot McKendrick and Thomas Kren, Illuminating the Renaissance : The Triumph of Flemish Manuscript Painting in Europe, Los Angeles, Getty Publications, 2003, 591 p. (p. 414-417 (item 124)
 Thomas Kren, Elizabeth C. Teviotdale, Adam S. Cohen, Kurtis Barstow, Masterpieces of the J. Paul Getty Museum: Illuminated Manuscripts, Getty Publications, 1997, 128 p., p. 117 (notice 50)
 Christopher De Hamel, Meetings with Remarkable Manuscripts : Twelve Journeys into the Medieval World'', London, Allen Lane, 2016, 640 p., p. 508-558.

External links

References

16th-century illuminated manuscripts
Illuminated books of hours
Illuminated manuscripts of the J. Paul Getty Museum